The Olsen Gang is a 1968 Danish comedy film directed by Erik Balling and starring Ove Sprogøe, Morten Grunwald, and Poul Bundgaard. This was the first film in the Olsen-banden-series.

Plot
The plot involves the Olsen Gang as they plan to become millionaires. The film starts by Egon being arrested for trying to rob a store, while the others, Kjeld and Benny, run away. After Egon is set free, the gang plan on stealing a golden statue which is worth 12 million. After some planning, the gang sets the plan in action and steal the golden statue. On their way to the airport, their car runs out of gas and the police come take the car (with the statue in it). Constantly chased by Mortensen, they manage to get the statue back and hide it in Kjeld's daughter's pram. Unfortunately, Kjeld's wife Yvonne is mad at Kjeld for letting the family wait at the airport, as well as leaving the pram outside on the sidewalk and takes it away and plans on going back to her mother.

The gang now chases after Yvonne (with Mortensen on their tail) and finally succeed on getting the pram back. After almost getting caught, Egon makes a little speech, just before he realizes that the statue is not in the pram. Egon goes mad and leaves Benny and Kjeld behind while he chases after Yvonne. Kjeld and Benny however walk back home with the pram. It then turns out that Yvonne didn't go to her mother after all but came back to Kjeld while Benny is driven home by Ulla. Egon is caught by the police on the ferry where Yvonne was supposed to be.
Two years later Egon is released and the gang continues to break the law by selling bananas outside the Copenhagen government building.

Cast

 Ove Sprogøe as Egon Olsen
 Morten Grunwald as Benny Frandsen
 Poul Bundgaard as Kjeld Jensen
 Peter Steen as Inspector Mortensen
 Jes Holtsø as Børge Jensen
 Kirsten Walther as Yvonne Jensen
 Poul Reichhardt as Police chief
 Lotte Tarp as Ulla: Benny's girlfriend who is a pornographic actor.
 Grethe Sønck as Connie
 Ole Monty as Sheriff
 Paul Hagen as Hansen
Additional Cast:
 Arthur Jensen
 Ejner Federspiel
 Poul Thomsen
 Ulf Pilgaard
 Ebba Amfeldt
 Einar Juhl
 Valsø Holm
 Lise Henningsen
 Hanne Løye 
 Lone Gersel
 Ernst Meyer
 Benny Hansen
 Edward Fleming 
 Solveig Sundborg
 Bjørn Puggaard-Müller
 Ego Brønnum-Jacobsen
 Søren Rode 
 Perry Knudsen
 Gunnar Strømvad
 Asger Clausen
 Gunnar Bigum
 Bjørn Spiro
 Knud Hilding

References

External links
 
 

1968 films
1968 comedy films
Danish comedy films
1960s Danish-language films
Films directed by Erik Balling
Films with screenplays by Erik Balling
1960s heist films
Olsen-banden films